Giovanni Philippone (San Giovanni Gemini, Sicily, 1922 – Pavia, 1993) was an Italian painter and sculptor.

Biography
Philippone obtained his high school diploma in Palermo in 1942. In 1946, at the end of World War II, he moved to Milan, where he graduated at the Academy of Fine Arts of Brera with the guidance of Aldo Carpi and art historian Eva Thea. During the same year, he won the Francesco Hayez Prize.

In 1950 he moved to Paris, where he attended the Academie des Beaux Art and studied with Leger. In Paris he met and befriended Gino Severini.
In 1952 he moved back to Milan and wrote a manifesto about the diatribe between abstraction and realism championing a neutral position that would accept both methodologies as valid. It was presented on the occasion of a group exhibition at the Bergamini gallery.

Philippone's artistic ideas included experimentations with materials such as glass and ceramics and collaborations with architects such as Terzaghi and Magnaghi. He then perfected his engraving technique with his friend and fellow artist Rino Cervi.

From 1945 to 1986 he exhibited his works in numerous galleries in Italy and abroad. Philippone passed away in 1993.

In 2013, three permanent rooms dedicated to the work of Philippone were unveiled at the Municipal Building of the former Collegio dei Filippini in Agrigento. The rooms were inaugurated on the occasion of the exhibition organized for the twentieth anniversary of his death.

Selected exhibitions 
 1945 – Accademia di Belle Arti di Palermo (Philippone, Sanfilippo, Guttuso, Attardi, Accardi)
 1946 – Francesco Hayez Prize, Brera Academy, Milan
 1946 – Fronte della Cultura, Rome (Birolli, Cassinari, Chighine, Migneco, Morlotti, Paganin, Philippone, Sassu, Testori, Cavaliere, Crippa, Dova, French, Kodra, Treccani and Vedova)
 1952 – Galleria Bergamini, Milan (Chighine, Paganin, Philippone, Garau, Traverso)
 1958 – Galleria d'Arte Selezione, Milan
 1958 – Galleria La Maggiolina, Alessandria
 1958 – De Gasperi Award, Palermo
 1958 – Triennale de la Jansonne, France
 1958 – National Museum, Bucharest (Guttuso, Mafai, Sassu, Manzù, Migneco, Philippone, Purificato, Bueno, Attardi, Treccani)
 1960 – Galleria Il Prisma, Milan
 1960 – Salon de l'Art libre, Palais de Beaux Art, Paris
 1961 – Galleria Montenapoleone, Milan
 1962 – Sicily Industry Award, Palermo
 1964 – Burdeke Galerie, Zurich
 1964 – Aterier Monpti, Munich
 1965 – Galleria San Fedele, Milan
 1965 – Galleria San Giorgio, alessandria
 1965 – Atelier Monpti, Munich (solo show)
 1965 – Galerie Studio 20, Munich
 1965 – The Parthenon Award, Palermo
 1966 – Galleria Mainieri, Milan
 1971 – Galleria Schettini, Milan
 1973 – Galleria Flaccovio, Palermo (solo show)
 1974 – Municipal Library, Milan (solo show)
 1975 – Arengario, Monza (Ronchi, Philippone)
 1980 – Galleria Civica, Campione d'Italia (solo show)
 1981 – Galleria Schettini, Milan
 1984 – Galleria Schettini, Milan
 1986 – Galleria Arteincornice, Turin
 2008 – Palazzo Palmieri, Bari
 2013 – Palazzo Comunale ex Convento dei Filippini, Agrigento (retrospective)

Bibliography 
Gianfranco Curletti, Giovanni Philippone, Galleria d'Arte Selezione, Milan, 1958
Giovanni Gemini, Passato e presente: acqueforti di Giovanni Philippone/fotografie di Pippo Di Grigoli, Studio Editoria Sud, Agrigento, 1987
Enciclopedia universale della pittura moderna, Seda, Milan, 1969, p. 2128
Leonardo Sciascia, Giovanni Philippone, Galleria Schettini, Milan, 1981
Giovanni Philippone and Enzo Li Gregni, Passato e presente: acqueforti di Giovanni Philippone/disegni di Enzo Li Gregni,  Studio Editoria Sud, Agrigento, 1987*Catalogo dell'arte moderna italiana, numero 23, Giorgio Mondadori, Milan, 1987, p. 355
Luigi Lo Bue, I fasci siciliani (illustrations by Giovanni Philippone), Legatoria industriale siciliana, Palermo, 1990
Mario De Micheli (ed.), Giovanni Philippone, Vangelista, Milan, 1995
Giacomo Agosti and Matteo Ceriana, Le Raccolte Storiche dell'Accademia di Brera, Centro Di, Florence, 1997
Enciclopedia artisti contemporanei: opere e quotazioni, S.T.M. Italia, Monza, 2009, p. 204.

References

Italian male painters
20th-century Italian painters
Italian contemporary artists
1922 births
1993 deaths
Brera Academy alumni
Italian expatriates in France
20th-century Italian male artists